"Midnight Special" is a traditional folk song thought to have originated among prisoners in the American South. The song refers to the passenger train Midnight Special and its "ever-loving light" (sometimes "ever-living light").

The song is historically performed in the country-blues style from the viewpoint of the prisoner and has been performed by many artists.

History

Lyrics appearing in the song were first recorded in print by Howard Odum in 1905:

However, these lyrics are known to be floater lines, appearing in various African-American songs of that period, notably in the "Grade-Songs", which are about prison captains and have nothing to do with a train or a light.

The first printed reference to the song itself was in a 1923 issue of Adventure magazine, a three-times-a-month pulp magazine published by the Ridgway Company. In 1927 Carl Sandburg published two different versions of "Midnight Special" in his The American Songbag, the first published versions.

The song was first commercially recorded on the OKeh label in 1926 as "Pistol Pete's Midnight Special" by Dave "Pistol Pete" Cutrell (a member of McGinty's Oklahoma Cow Boy Band). Cutrell follows the traditional song except for semi-comedic stanzas about McGinty and Gray and "a cowboy band": 

In March 1929, the band, now Otto Gray and the Oklahoma Cowboys, recorded the song again, this time with the traditional title using only the traditional lyrics.

Sam Collins recorded the song commercially in 1927 under the title "The Midnight Special Blues"  for Gennett Records. His version also follows the traditional style. His is the first to name the woman in the story, Little Nora, and he refers to the Midnight Special's "ever-living" light:

In 1934, Huddie William "Lead Belly" Ledbetter recorded a version of the song at Angola Prison for John and Alan Lomax, who mistakenly attributed it to him as the author. However, Ledbetter, for his Angola session, appears to have inserted several stanzas relating to a 1923 Houston jailbreak into the traditional song.  Ledbetter recorded at least three versions of the song, one with the Golden Gate Quartet, a gospel group (recorded for RCA at Victor Studio #2, New York City, June 15, 1940).

John and Alan Lomax, in their book, Best Loved American Folk Songs, told a credible story identifying the Midnight Special as a train from Houston shining its light into a cell in the Sugar Land Prison. They also describe Ledbetter's version as "the Negro jailbird's ballad to match Hard Times Poor Boy. Like so many American folk songs, its hero is not a man but a train." The light of the train is seen as the light of salvation, the train which could take them away from the prison walls. It is highly reminiscent of the imagery of such gospel songs as "Let the Light from Your Lighthouse Shine on Me". Carl Sandburg had a different view. He believed the subject of the song would rather be run over by a train than spend more time in jail.

Although later versions place the locale of the song near Houston, early versions such as "Walk Right In Belmont" (Wilmer Watts; Frank Wilson, 1927) and "North Carolina Blues" (Roy Martin, 1930) — both essentially the same song as "Midnight Special" — place it in North Carolina.
Most of the early versions, however, have no particular location. Only one recording, collected by the Lomaxes at the Mississippi State Penitentiary, actually identifies the railroad operating the Midnight Special — the Illinois Central which had a route through Mississippi.

Other versions

Country musicians Wilma Lee and Stoney Cooper had a top 5 country hit with their reworking of the song in 1959 as "Big Midnight Special".

Only two versions of the song have reached the US Billboard Hot 100. Paul Evans recorded the highest-charting version of "Midnight Special," reaching number 16 in the winter of 1960.  Five years later, Johnny Rivers' version reached number 20 in 1965. The Johnny Rivers version was used as the theme for the NBC music program The Midnight Special.

Lead Belly, Big Bill Broonzy, Sonny Terry & Brownie McGhee, Odetta, Les Paul, The Kingston Trio (who also recorded their song "The Tijuana Jail", which retains the same music but with new lyrics), Pete Seeger, Peter, Paul and Mary, Burl Ives, Big Joe Turner, Bobby Darin, Cisco Houston, Jimmy Smith, Mungo Jerry, Van Morrison, Little Richard, Buckwheat Zydeco, Otis Rush, The Spencer Davis Group, Lonnie Donegan, Eric Clapton, The Louvin Brothers, Long John Baldry, The Kentucky Headhunters, Willie Watson, Mischief Brew, Hoyt Axton, Odetta, Billy Bragg, and Creedence Clearwater Revival, among others, have recorded the song. Jody Miller arranged her own version and included it on her first album Wednesday's Child is Full of Woe in 1963.

Harry Belafonte's 1962 version is notable for containing the first official recording of Bob Dylan, who played harmonica.

Harry Dean Stanton performs the song in the 1967 movie Cool Hand Luke.

Creedence Clearwater Revival‘s 1969 version was used in the opening sequence of Twilight Zone: The Movie, in a scene featuring Albert Brooks and Dan Aykroyd enthusiastically singing along.

ABBA recorded the song in 1975 for charity, as a part of a folk medley, along with "Pick a Bale of Cotton" and "On Top of Old Smokey". It was the B-side to their 1978 single "Summer Night City". The medley represents the group's only recording of material not written by Benny Andersson and Björn Ulvaeus after their breakthrough with "Ring Ring" in 1973.

Dylan references a line from the song — "Shine your light on me" — on the second track, "Precious Angel", of his 1979 gospel album Slow Train Coming.

The Dutch band Drukwerk also recorded a cover of "Midnight Special" for their 1982 album Tweede Druk, mixing English and Dutch vocals.

Paul McCartney has performed it numerous times. It was the closing song on his 1988 album Снова в СССР and was performed on his 1991 appearance on MTV Unplugged, but was not included on the accompanying album.

Mischief Brew recorded a cover of "The Midnight Special" for their 2006 album, Songs From Under the Sink.

NEEDTOBREATHE used the song line "Let the midnight special shine a light on me" as a segue into their original song "Mercy's Shore" on their 2022 album Live From Bridgestone Arena.

See also
 "Let Your Light Shine on Me", a religious variant of the same song
List of train songs

References

Bibliography
Cohen, Norm. Long Steel Rail: The Railroad in American Folksong. University of Illinois Press (2nd ed), 2000. 
Oliver, Paul. Songsters and Saints: Vocal Tradition on Race Records. Cambridge University Press, 1984. 
Collins, "Crying" Sam. "Midnight Special Blues". Jailhouse Blues, 14. Yazoo, CD, 1990.
Lomax, John A. and Alan Lomax. American Ballads and Folk Songs. Dover Publications (reprint), 1994. 
Otto Gray's Oklahoma Cowboys. "Pistol Pete's Midnight Special" by Dave Cutrell acc. by McGinty's Oklahoma Cow Boy Band. Early Cowboy Band. British Archive of Country Music, CD D 139, 2006.
Russell, Tony. Country Music Records: A Discography, 1921–1942. Oxford University Press, 2004. 
Waltz, Robert B; David G. Engle. "The Midnight Special". The Traditional Ballad Index: An Annotated Bibliography of the Folk Songs of the English-Speaking World. Hosted by California State University, Fresno, Folklore, 2007.

Lead Belly songs
Burl Ives songs
Big Joe Turner songs
Paul Evans (musician) songs
Paul McCartney songs
Peter, Paul and Mary songs
The Beatles songs
The Weavers songs
Van Morrison songs
Creedence Clearwater Revival songs
American folk songs
1960 singles
1965 singles
Johnny Rivers songs
Songs about trains
Wilma Lee Cooper songs
Stoney Cooper songs
Year of song unknown
Songwriter unknown
Songs about prison